Wrestling at the 1980 Summer Olympics was represented by twenty events (all — men's individual). They were split into two disciplines (ten events each): Freestyle and Greco-Roman. All  events were held in the Wrestling hall of the Sports Complex of the Central Sports Club of the Army (north-western part of Moscow) between 20 and 31 July.

Medal summary

Freestyle

Greco-Roman

Medals

Participating nations
A total of 266 wrestlers from 35 nations competed at the Moscow Games:

See also
List of World and Olympic Champions in men's freestyle wrestling
List of World and Olympic Champions in Greco-Roman wrestling

References

Sources
 

 
1980
1980 Summer Olympics events
O